State Road 206 (NM 206) is a  state highway in the US state of New Mexico. NM 206's southern terminus is in Lovington at US 82, and the northern terminus is at U.S. Route 70 (US 70) in Portales.

Major intersections

See also

References

206
Transportation in Roosevelt County, New Mexico
Transportation in Lea County, New Mexico